Live in the LBC & Diamonds in the Rough is the first live DVD, and compilation album by heavy metal band Avenged Sevenfold released on September 16, 2008 by Warner Bros. Records. The live DVD features the band's April 10, 2008 show at Long Beach Arena headlining the Rockstar Taste of Chaos tour, while the CD contains previously unreleased B-sides that were recorded during the making of the band's self-titled 2007 album, plus covers, and other never-before-heard material.

Production and release

The DVD was directed by Core Entertainment's Rafa Alcantara, who also worked on the band's critically acclaimed 2007 road documentary All Excess.

On August 15, 2008, a trailer was released by Avenged Sevenfold on their YouTube channel. On September 5, 2008, Avenged Sevenfold released the live version of "Seize the Day" from the DVD through their imeem account. "Unholy Confessions" and "Scream" were later streamed before the release as well.

There are two alternate mixes of songs on their self-titled album:
The CLA Mix of "Almost Easy" is simply the original song as mixed by Chris Lord-Alge, instead of Andy Wallace. This includes the mixing of The Rev's vocal take as well as M. Shadows.
The alternate version of "Afterlife" features a different bridge and a string section throughout the entire song.

The Rev performs vocals on the tracks "Critical Acclaim", "Crossroads", "Flash of the Blade", "Almost Easy", "A Little Piece of Heaven" and "Afterlife".

Live in the LBC & Diamonds in the Rough has been certified Platinum by the RIAA. On November 5, 2008, the CD/DVD combo was certified Gold, but has now reached Platinum by selling over 100,000 (Video Longform platinum) copies.

In January 2020, Avenged Sevenfold released "Set Me Free", an unreleased song recorded during the Hail to the King recording sessions. They also announced that the song would be included in a remastered re-release of Live in the LBC & Diamonds in the Rough, expected to be released on March 6 and February 7, respectively. A limited edition clear vinyl of Diamonds in the Rough was also announced.

Critical reception

The album received mixed to positive reviews upon release in 2008. Jim Kaz from IGN wrote "Avenged Sevenfold have proven that there is a way to successfully crossover and bend genres without alienating or insulting the base. With top-notch musicianship and a knack for pinching the best bits from different styles and eras, this is one band to keep pace with." Ultimate Guitar wrote "The CD feels very much like another fresh studio release if you haven't been exposed to the B-sides, while the DVD features a sound mix that is just as strong as if it was also recorded in the studio."

Track listing
Live in the LBC (DVD)

''Diamonds in the Rough'' (CD)

Digital download tracks (pre-order bonus)

Personnel
 M. Shadowslead vocals, organ intro on "Critical Acclaim"
 Zacky Vengeancerhythm guitar, co-lead guitar, backing vocals, acoustic guitar on "Seize the Day"
 Synyster Gateslead guitar, backing vocals
 The Revdrums, percussion, co-lead vocals on "Critical Acclaim", "Afterlife" and "A Little Piece of Heaven", backing vocals
 Johnny Christbass guitar, lead vocals on intro of "Seize the Day", backing vocals

Diamonds in the Rough 

Avenged Sevenfold
 M. Shadows – lead vocals
 Zacky Vengeance – rhythm guitar, lead guitar on "Demons" and "Dancing Dead" outro, backing vocals
 Synyster Gates – lead guitar, backing vocals
 The Rev – drums, backing vocals, co-lead vocals on "Crossroads"
 Johnny Christ – bass

Additional personnel
 Brian Haner – orchestration in "Until the End"
 Mike Portnoy – drums, percussion on "4:00 A.M." and "Lost It All"
 Arin Ilejay – drums, percussion on "St. James" and "Set Me Free"

Charts

Diamonds in the Rough

Diamonds in the Rough 2020 reissue

Certifications

References

Avenged Sevenfold albums
2008 video albums
2008 live albums
Live video albums
Warner Records live albums
Warner Records video albums
B-side compilation albums